Evelyn May Clowes, known by the pseudonym Elinor Mordaunt (7 May 1872 – 25 June 1942), was an English author, writer and traveller born in Nottinghamshire, England. Her travels included Mauritius and Australia; she undertook a wide variety of employment.

Early life
Mordaunt was the fifth child of St. John Legh Clowes, a South African writer, and the Honourable Elizabeth Caroline Bingham. She was born in the village of Cotgrave, Nottinghamshire, and christened as Evelyn May Clowes. Her maternal grandfather was the Irish nobleman Denis Arthur Bingham, 3rd Baron Clanmorris. Growing up in genteel circumstances, her early childhood was spent at Charlton Down House near Cheltenham, Gloucestershire, and her teenage years near Heythrop in the Cotswolds. She was educated at home by governesses, excelling at German, Latin, Greek, shorthand writing, landscape painting, and fabric and wallpaper design.

Australia
In 1897 she went to Mauritius as companion to her cousin Caroline (wife of Sir George Le Hunte) and in 1898 married Maurice Wilhemn Wiehe, who owned a sugar plantation. She gave birth to two stillborn children. After a few years of marriage, she found it impossible to live with her husband and returned to England. Shortly afterwards she went to Australia, arriving 10 June 1902 and lived at Melbourne for about eight years. Her son, Godfrey Weston Wiehe, was born 9 March 1903. 

It was necessary for Mordaunt to earn a living and while in Melbourne she edited a woman's fashion paper, wrote short stories and articles, made blouses, designed embroideries, tilled gardens, acted as a housekeeper, and did artistic work. Her health was not strong, but she undertook any kind of work which would provide a living for herself and her infant son. This gained her an experience of life which was of the greatest use to her as an author.

Writings

Mordaunt's first book, the Garden of Contentment, was published in England in 1902 under her pen-name Elinor Mordaunt. At Melbourne she published a volume of sketches, Rosemary, That's for Remembrance (1909), and in 1911 appeared On the Wallaby through Victoria, by E. M. Clowes, an interesting account of conditions in that state at that period. Returning to England on 14 July 1909 she soon began a long series of volumes of fiction. She changed her name by deed poll to Evelyn May Mordaunt on 1 July 1915 and gained a reputation as a writer of short stories for magazines. Mrs Mordaunt travelled in the East Indies and adjacent islands and used her experiences in her fiction, and in travel books such as The Venture Book, The Further Venture Book, and Purely for Pleasure. Her autobiography, Sinabada, published in 1937, includes an account of her early life in Australia with appreciative reference to the kindnesses she had received. Her son by her first marriage was alive when she was writing Sinabada; she mentions that he had married and had children. On 27 January 1933 at Tenerife, Canary Islands, she was married to Robert Rawnsley Bowles, aged 66, a retired barrister from Gloucestershire. In her own words, the marriage "ended in tragedy."
 
She died on 25 June 1942 at the Radcliffe Infirmary, Oxford. 

Possibly her best work was put into her short stories, often showing a grim sense of tragedy and humour. A collection of them appeared in 1934, The Tales of Elinor Mordaunt. In addition to the volumes included in Miller, she was also the author of Death it is, Judge Not, Hobby Horse, Roses in December, Tropic Heat, Here Too is Valour, and Blitz Kids. Mordaunt was revealed as the author of a pseudonymous novel called Gin and Bitters, referencing the debate in the London publishing world over whether Somerset Maugham had based the character of Alroy Kear in Cakes and Ale on Hugh Walpole. The book was removed from sale in the UK, apparently under pressure from Maugham.

Bibliography

As E. M. Clowes
Non-fiction
On the Wallaby: Through Australia (1911)

As 'Eleanor Mordaunt'
A Ship of Solace (1911)
The Cost of It (1912)
Lu of the Ranges (1913)
The Garden of Contentment (1913)

As 'Elinor Mordaunt'
Non-fiction
People, Houses and Ships (1924)
The Further Venture Book (1926)
Purely for Pleasure (1931)
Sinabada (1937)
Hobby Horse (1940)
Novels
Simpson (1914)
Bellamy (1914)
The Rose of Youth (1915)
The Family (1915)
The Park Wall (1916)
The Pendulum (1918)
The Processionals (1918)
The Little Soul (1920)
Laura Creichton (1921)
Alas, That Spring - ! (1922)
Reputation (1923)
The Dark Fire (1927)
The Centre of the Cyclone. Serialised: Daily Mirror (1928)
And Then? (1927)
Father and Daughter (1928)
These Generations (1930)
Full Circle (1931)
Cross Winds (1932)
The Girl and the Colt. Serialised: Wicklow People (1932)
Mrs Van Kleek (1933)
Royals Free (1937)
Three Generations (1937)
Pity of the World (1938)
Roses in December (1939)
Judge Not (1940)
Blitz Kids (1941)
This Was Our Life (1942)
To Sea, To Sea (1943)
Short story collections
The Island (1914)
Before Midnight (1917)
Old Wine in New Bottles (1919)
Short Shipments (1922)
Shoe and Stocking Stories (1926)
Traveller's Pack (1933)
The Tales of Elinor Mordaunt (1934)
Death It Is (1939)
The Villa and The Vortex (2021)

As 'A. Riposte'Gin and Bitters (1931)

References

Sources

Sally O'Neill, 'Mordaunt, Evelyn May (1872–1942)', Australian Dictionary of Biography, Volume 10, MUP, 1986, pp 582–583

External links

The Best British Short Stories of 1922 contribution by Elinor Mordaunt
Tonga extract from The Venture Book'' by Elinor Mordaunt

English travel writers
British women travel writers
English short story writers
English memoirists
1872 births
1942 deaths
People from Cotgrave
19th-century Australian women
20th-century Australian women